The National Workers' Party (NPR) was a political party in Poland.

History
The NPR was established in Warsaw on 23 May 1920 by a merger of the National Workers' Union and the National Party of Workers. Strongest in Greater Poland, Pomerania, Łódź and Silesia, it had around 150,000 members by the following year. It received around 5% of the vote in the 1922 elections, winning 18 seats in the Sejm and three in the Senate.

The party was a member of the Józef Piłsudski governments until 1926, but then split into two factions; one retained the NPR name, whilst the other became known as NPR-Left. The NPR-Left supported Piłsudski's Sanation regime, whilst the NPR, which had been reduced to around 80,000 members, opposed it. The 1928 elections saw the NPR's vote share fall to 2%. As a result, it was reduced to 11 seats in the Sejm and two in the Senate.

In 1930 the NPR joined the Centrolew alliance, which contested the 1930 elections. The alliance won 79 seats, of which the NPR took eight. It later became part of the Front Morges, and by 1934 only had around 20,000 members. The party boycotted the 1935 elections, and in 1937 it merged with the Polish Christian Democratic Party to form the Labor Party.

Ideology
The party's platform in 1921 called for social solidarity and a strong parliamentary democracy, and supported autonomy for national minorities except Jews.

Election results

Sejm

References

Defunct political parties in Poland
1920 establishments in Poland
1937 disestablishments in Poland
Political parties established in 1920
Political parties disestablished in 1937